Alan Cooke (born 1966 in Chesterfield, Derbyshire) is an English former international table tennis player and current coach. He is a six-time National Singles Champion and has won 18 National titles.

He made his senior England debut in the Israeli Open just before his 17th birthday, and played in the 1988 Summer Olympics.

In 2016 he coached the England team to a bronze medal at the 2016 World Table Tennis Championships.

See also
 List of England players at the World Team Table Tennis Championships

References

Living people
1966 births
English male table tennis players
Olympic table tennis players of Great Britain
Table tennis players at the 1988 Summer Olympics
Table tennis players at the 1992 Summer Olympics
Sportspeople from Chesterfield, Derbyshire